"Call My Name" is a song by Prince, from his 2004 album Musicology. The song won Grammy Award for Best Male R&B Vocal Performance at the 47th Annual Grammy Awards in 2005.

Although it was not officially released as a single, it peaked at #75 on the Billboard Hot 100 and 27 on the R&B chart. A music video for the song was filmed as well.

References

External links

Prince (musician) songs
Songs written by Prince (musician)
2004 songs
Music videos directed by Sanaa Hamri
NPG Records singles
Song recordings produced by Prince (musician)
Contemporary R&B ballads